The String Quintet No. 4 in G minor, K. 516, written by Wolfgang Amadeus Mozart, is like all of Mozart's string quintets a "viola quintet" in that it is scored for string quartet and an extra viola (that is, two violins, two violas, and cello).
The mood of the piece is dark and melancholic, typical of Mozart's G minor works.

The work was completed on May 16, 1787, less than a month after the completion of his grand C major Quintet, K. 515. 
This would not be the last time that a great pair of C major/G minor works of the same form would be published in close proximity and assigned consecutive Köchel numbers. The following year, the 40th (G minor) and 41st (C major) symphonies (respectively K. 550 and K. 551) would be completed within a few weeks of each other.

Movements

The work is in four movements:
I. Allegro  (G minor, sonata form)
II. Menuetto: Allegretto  (G minor, ternary form, trio in G major)
III. Adagio ma non troppo  (E-flat major, modified sonata form with no development)
IV. Adagio  (G minor) – Allegro  (G major, sonata rondo form)

The first movement is in sonata form with both the first and second themes beginning in G minor. The movement does not resolve to the major key in the recapitulation, and it has a minor-key ending.

The minuet, placed second, is a minuet in name only, as the turbulent G minor theme and heavy third-beat chords make this movement very undance-like. The central trio, by contrast, is in a bright G major; unusually it is written in a 3-bar rhythm, which it picks up from the final bars of the menuetto. 

The third movement, in E-flat major, is slow, melancholic and wistful, furthering the despair brought forth by the previous movements. Pyotr Ilyich Tchaikovsky said of this movement: "No one has ever known as well how to interpret so exquisitely in music the sense of resigned and inconsolable sorrow."

The start of the fourth movement is not the typical quick-tempo finale, but a slow aria back in the home key of G minor. It is a dirge or lament that is even slower than the previous movement. The music remains in this dark area for a few minutes before reaching an ominous pause. At this point, Mozart launches into the ebullient G major Allegro, which creates a stark contrast between it and the movements that preceded it. Critics have often questioned how such an insouciant and carefree finale could follow after three-plus movements of intense pathos, even though it conforms perfectly to the Classical understanding of a finale as resolving everything that preceded it.

References

External links

String quintets by Wolfgang Amadeus Mozart
Compositions in G minor
1787 compositions